Hydai or Kydai was a town of ancient Caria. Its name does not appear in ancient authors, but is inferred from epigraphic evidence; its demonym was Hydaieis or Kydaieis (Κυδαιεῖς). It was a polis (city-state) and a member of the Delian League.
 
Its site is located near Damlarboğaz, Asiatic Turkey. It has been partially excavated and some of the artifacts are displayed at the Milas Museum.

References

Populated places in ancient Caria
Former populated places in Turkey
Greek city-states
Members of the Delian League
Ancient Greek archaeological sites in Turkey
Milas District
History of Muğla Province